National Football League Cheerleading or simply NFL Cheerleading, is a group of professional cheerleading organizations in the United States. 25 of the 32 NFL teams include a cheerleading squad in their franchise. Cheerleaders are a popular attraction that can give a team more coverage/airtime, popular local support, and increased media image. In 1954, the Baltimore Colts became the first NFL team to have cheerleaders. They were part of Baltimore's Marching Colts.

Most NFL cheerleading squads are a part-time job. Often, cheerleaders have completed or are attending a university, and continue on to other careers after cheering for one to four seasons. The members participate in practice, training camp, games, appearances, photo shoots, and charity events. Apart from their main duties of cheering during the football games, the cheerleaders have many other responsibilities, the main one is marketing the team they cheer for. Nearly every team member is available for appearances at schools, events, conferences, etc., for a set fee.

An anticipated annual event is the release of each squad's calendar, featuring members for each month in swimsuits or uniforms.

Also many cheerleading squads have "Junior Cheerleading" programs, in which they teach children, usually in the 6-12 year age range, on how to dance, perform on selected gamedays with the main squad, and often NFL cheerleaders act as mentors and role models to the children.

As well as being a mainstay of American football culture, the cheerleaders are one of the biggest entertainment groups to regularly perform for the United States Armed Forces overseas with performances and tours being enlisted by the USO. Teams send their variety show, an elite group of their best members, to perform combination shows of dance, music, baton twirling, acrobatics, gymnastics, and more. In February 2007, the Buffalo Bills even sent a squad of eight along with their choreographer into the war zone of Iraq. In 1996, the San Francisco 49ers Cheerleaders and their director  helicoptered into the war inflicted country of Bosnia with the USO and the U.S. Army. The U.S. troops in Korea have been entertained during the holiday season with the USO's Bob Hope Tour. Over the years, the tour has featured NFL cheerleaders from the Dallas Cowboys, San Francisco 49ers, and Washington.

Cheerleader competitions
The first "Battle of the NFL Cheerleaders" was held in 1979 in Hollywood, Florida. Two cheerleaders from each cheerleading team compete against other mini-teams in various athletic events. The events include kayaking, 100 yard dash, obstacle courses, and other events. The Minnesota Vikings Cheerleaders took home the title in 1979. In 1980, it was held in Atlantic City, New Jersey and the Washington Redskinettes were the champions. The winners were Shiona Baum and Jeannie Fritz, and each received a car as the grand prize. The competition was resurrected in 2006 by the NFL Network, and was called NFL Cheerleader Playoffs. The playoffs were taped between July 17 and July 21, 2006, at Six Flags New England in Agawam, Massachusetts. Two-person teams of cheerleaders from 25 of the NFL's 32 teams participated in a four-event series of competitions. The first two events tested the cheerleaders' athletic abilities in events like the 100-yard dash, kayaking, tandem cycling, and the obstacle course. The third event was a trivia challenge called "Know Your NFL." The final competition was a one-minute dance routine, similar to what they normally perform on NFL sidelines. The San Diego Chargers team (Casie and Shantel) defeated the Atlanta Falcons and St. Louis Rams squads to win the overall championship. The 3 teams finished in a three-way tie, with 210 points. The Chargers were declared the winners based on winning the dance competition.

Teams
Listed by name, with corresponding NFL team.

Teams without cheerleaders

As of 2021, seven teams do not have cheerleading squads: Buffalo Bills, Chicago Bears, Cleveland Browns, Green Bay Packers, New York Giants, Los Angeles Chargers and the Pittsburgh Steelers. The Packers do, however, use a collegiate squad to cheer at home games. Super Bowl XLV between the Steelers and the Packers in February 2011 was the first time a Super Bowl featured no cheerleaders. The Browns and the Giants are the only NFL teams that have never had cheerleaders, while the other aforementioned teams have had cheer squads in the past. However, there are reports that the Browns did have cheerleaders in 1971, but no records exist.

The Buffalo Bills endorsed the officially independent Buffalo Jills from 1966 to 2013; when several cheerleaders sued both the Bills and the Bills organizations, the Jills suspended operations.

Teams of "unofficial" cheerleaders began emerging in 2010 for NFL teams that did not have their own dance squad. These unofficial cheerleaders are not sanctioned by the NFL or any franchise in the NFL and therefore are not allowed to perform at games, represent the football team at any outside functions, or use any of the team's branding or trademarked colors on their uniforms. The teams are sponsored by local businesses, and the cheerleaders perform prior to the game, at tailgate parties, and other local events. Some also attend the local NFL games in uniform, and sit together in their block of season ticket seats. Their audition process, costuming, and choreography are very similar to official NFL cheer teams. Some also produce an annual swimsuit calendar, just like the legitimate cheerleaders. All of the independent teams hope at some point to be embraced by the NFL as "official" cheerleaders of their local teams.

 The Detroit Pride Cheerleaders were the first independent professional team, put together in August 2010 to support the Lions. However, as the squad was not officially recognized by the Lions, it could not use the Lions' logos nor colors. In 2016, the Lions started an official cheerleading squad.
 The Gotham City Cheerleaders were organized in August 2011 to support all New York sports, but are most closely associated with the Giants. The team has also been known as the New York Unofficials, the Unofficial Dancers of the New York Giants, and the Gotham's Team Blue Army Dancers.
 The Cleveland Spirit Cheerleaders were created in September 2012 to support the Browns as a test team to attract fan interest. This cheer team was created by the same people responsible for the Detroit Pride.

Male NFL Cheerleaders
Glenn Welt was the first male to try out as an NFL cheerleader, doing so on May 20, 1978. The Miami Dolphins would not let him compete when he arrived at the Orange Bowl in Miami. The incident later became a nationwide news story, led to a federal anti-discrimination case, and was spoofed on a November 1979 episode of Mork & Mindy. The episode caused plans for a CBS made-for-TV movie starring Robin Williams as Welt to be scrapped, while also misrepresenting Welt and male cheerleaders in general when Williams pranced onto a football field dressed in a female outfit.

Male NFL cheerleaders as dancers for the past few decades have been rare due to social norms and marketability. However, in 1998 the Baltimore Ravens Cheerleaders were the first cheerleader squad to start using male stuntmen in the squad.

Following trends in dance with popular summer dance series such as the Strictly Come Dancing franchise, So You Think You Can Dance, and World of Dance, where competitions are co-ed, in 2009, the first male dancers were added to National Football League by the Dallas Cowboys. The Dallas Cowboys introduced the Rhythm & Blue Dancers, founded by Charlotte Jones and directed by Jenny Durbin Smith, becoming the first co-Ed dance team in NFL history. They perform every home game on stage, half-time and sideline with their dynamic hip hop dancing, stunting, freestyle and tumbling. They are also responsible for the first NFL Drum Corp and in 2017 created a 7-16 year old co-Ed hip hop dance team Dallas Cowboys Rookie Squad. In 2018, the Los Angeles Rams and New Orleans Saints adopted male dancers to their dance teams as well.

In 2019, the Seattle Seahawks, New England Patriots, Tennessee Titans, Indianapolis Colts, Tampa Bay Buccaneers and Philadelphia Eagles added males to their squads, and the Seahawks cheerleaders became the second permanent co-ed squad after the Ravens. In 2021, for the first time, the Panthers TopCats had multiple (3) men make the final team with the Kansas City Chiefs Cheerleaders also adding a man to their team. Most of the squads' male cheerleaders are involved in stunts.

In most situations, male cheerleaders are typically former college cheerleaders themselves, with a heavy emphasis on stunts and strength training.

Transgender NFL Cheerleaders 
In March 2022, Justine Lindsay, a transgender woman, made the Carolina Panthers, becoming the first openly transgender person to cheer in the NFL.

Criticism and controversy 
There have been criticisms that NFL cheerleading is sexist, is objectifying women, exploitative, and outdated.

In addition, several cheerleaders have sued their respective teams for violating minimum wage laws, mistreatment from management, exploitative rules and behaviors, sexual harassment, and groping. Such injustices regarding the pay and employment treatment of NFL cheerleaders were highlighted in the 2019 documentary film A Woman's Work: The NFL's Cheerleader Problem.

However, defenders and proponents of NFL Cheerleading have stated that cheerleading helps young women engage with the NFL at the most visible and prominent level, provide the NFL with role models for its female fans, and are a cost-effective way of promoting a team at events. Also, NFL cheerleading squads have been used as advocates from their teams for female empowerment or LGBT rights.

NFL spokesperson David Tossell in 2013 defended NFL cheerleading by stating, "Cheerleading has a long tradition in the majority of American sports at both professional and amateur levels; Cheerleaders are part of American football culture from youth leagues to the NFL and are part of the game day experience for our fans."

Male NFL cheerleaders have increased in the 2010s to help offset changing societal attitudes and concerns that NFL cheerleading was sexist.

Pro Bowl

A top honor for an NFL Cheerleader is to be selected as a Pro Bowl Cheerleader. The group is composed of an all-star cheerleader (one from each NFL cheer team) that represents her NFL team at the Pro Bowl in Hawaii. The Pro Bowl Cheerleaders were founded in 1992 and directed by Jay Howarth and Angela King-Twitero. Each year, one squad member from every NFL team is chosen to participate in the collective Pro Bowl cheerleading squad. They are picked by either their own squads or by the fans via Internet polling.

Notable NFL Cheerleaders

See also
List of cheerleaders
Dallas Cowboys Cheerleaders: Making the Team
National Basketball Association Cheerleading
Promotional model

References

External links